Scaphella is a genus of large sea snails, marine gastropod mollusks in the family Volutidae, the volutes.

Distribution
This is a tropical genus occurring in the Western Atlantic Ocean and the Caribbean Sea.

Description
There are both living and fossil species in this genus, which first appeared in the Paleocene. The fusiform, patterned shell is small to large. The protoconch is smooth and papilliform, often with a calcarella. The columellar plates are weak or absent. The periostracum is present, but an operculum is not. The radula is small, and variable from Y-shaped to tricuspid.

Species
Species within the genus Scaphella include:
 Scaphella atlantis Clench, 1946
 † Scaphella baudoni (Deshayes, 1865)
 Scaphella biminiensis Oleinik, Petuch & Aley IV, 2012 
 Scaphella contoyensis Emerson & Old, 1979
 Scaphella dohrni (G.B. Sowerby III, 1903)
 Scaphella dubia (Broderip, 1827) - Dubious Volute
 Scaphella evelina F. M. Bayer, 1971
 Scaphella garciai Bail, 2007
 Scaphella gaudiati Bail & Shelton, 2001
 Scaphella gouldiana (Dall, 1887)
 Scaphella junonia (Lamarck, 1804) - type species
 † Scaphella kendrae Petuch & Berschauer, 2021 
 Scaphella luizcoutoi Coltro, 1998
 Scaphella macginnorum García & Emerson, 1987
 † Scaphella macrocephala Finlay, 1927 
 † Scaphella martinshugari Petuch, 1994 
 Scaphella matchetti Petuch & Sargent, 2011
 Scaphella neptunia (Clench & Aguayo, 1940)
 Scaphella robusta Dall, 1889
 Scaphella stimpsonorum T. Cossignani & Allary, 2019
Species brought into synonymy
 Scaphella benthalis Dall, 1896: synonym of Arctomelon benthale (Dall, 1896)
 Scaphella butleri Clench, 1953: synonym of Scaphella junonia butleri Clench, 1953
 Scaphella carlae Landau & C. M. Silva, 2006 †: synonym of Euroscaphella carlae (Landau & C. M. Silva, 2006) †
 Scaphella caroli Iredale, 1924: synonym of Amoria maculata (Swainson, 1822)
 Scaphella cognata Finlay, 1926 †: synonym of Teremelon cognata (Finlay, 1926) †
 Scaphella dannevigi Verco, 1912: synonym of Livonia nodiplicata (Cox, 1910)
 Scaphella elegantissima Suter, 1917 †: synonym of Teremelon elegantissima (Suter, 1917) † (original combination)
 Scaphella florida (Clench & Aguayo, 1940): synonym of Scaphella dohrni (G. B. Sowerby III, 1903)
 Scaphella hedleyi Iredale, 1914: synonym of Amoria (Amoria) damoni Gray, 1864 represented as Amoria damoni Gray, 1864
 Scaphella honi Glibert, 1938 †: synonym of Euroscaphella honi (Glibert, 1938) †
 Scaphella johnstoneae Clench, 1953: synonym of Scaphella junonia (Lamarck, 1804)
 Scaphella lamberti (J. Sowerby, 1816) †: synonym of Euroscaphella lamberti (J. Sowerby, 1816) †
 Scaphella lautenschlageri Volobueva, 1981 †: synonym of Arctomelon lautenschlageri (Volobueva, 1981) † (original combination)
 Scaphella marionae (Pilsbry & Olsson, 1953): synonym of Scaphella robusta marionae (Pilsbry & Olsson, 1953)
 Scaphella moslemica Hedley, 1912: synonym of Amoria undulata (Lamarck, 1804)
 Scaphella papillaris Swainson, 1840: synonym of Ericusa papillosa (Swainson, 1822)
 Scaphella pretiosa Finlay, 1926 †: synonym of Teremelon pretiosa (Finlay, 1926) †
 Scaphella tumidior Finlay, 1926 †: synonym of Teremelon tumidior (Finlay, 1926) †
 Scaphella veliocassina Pacaud & Meyer, 2014 †: synonym of Euroscaphella veliocassina (Pacaud & Meyer, 2014) †
 Scaphella victoriensis Cossmann, 1899 †: synonym of Notopeplum politum (Tate, 1889) † (unnecessary replacement name for Voluta polita Tate, 1889, erroneously stated by Cossmann to be a junior homonym of "Voluta polita" Conrad)
 Scaphella vignyensis Chavan, 1949 †: synonym of Euroscaphella vignyensis (Chavan, 1949) †
 Scaphella volvestrensis Villatte, 1962 †: synonym of Euroscaphella volvestrensis (Villatte, 1962) †
 Scaphella worki Coltro J., 1998: synonym of Scaphella robusta marionae (Pilsbry & Olsson, 1953)

References

 Bail, P & Poppe, G. T. 2001. A conchological iconography: a taxonomic introduction of the recent Volutidae. Hackenheim-Conchbook, 30 pp, 5 pl.
 Petuch E.J. & Sargent D.M. (2011) Rare and unusual shells of the Florida Keys and adjacent areas. Wellington, Florida: MdM Publishing. 158 pp.

External links
 Swainson W. (1829-1833). Zoological Illustrations, or original figures and descriptions of new, rare, or interesting animals, selected chiefly from the classes of ornithology, entomology, and conchology, and arranged according to their apparent affinities. Second series. London: Baldwin & Cradock. (Vol. 1-3): pl. 1-30
 Dall, W. H. (1906). Note on some names in the Volutidae. The Nautilus. 19(12): 143-144
 Pilsbry, H. A. & Olsson, A. A. (1953). Materials for a revision of East Coast and Floridan Volutes. The Nautilus. 67 (1): 1-13.
 Adams, H. & Adams, A. (1853-1858). The genera of Recent Mollusca; arranged according to their organization. London, van Voorst. Vol. 1: xl + 484 pp.; vol. 2: 661 pp.; vol. 3: 138 pls
 Dall, W. H. (1906). Note on some names in the Volutidae. The Nautilus. 19(12): 143-144

Volutidae
Extant Paleocene first appearances